The 2010 WGC-Bridgestone Invitational was a golf tournament held August 5–8 over the South Course at Firestone Country Club in Akron, Ohio. It was the 12th WGC-Bridgestone Invitational tournament, and the third of four World Golf Championships events held in 2010.

Hunter Mahan won with a score of 64 (−6) on Sunday to finish at 268 (−12), two strokes ahead of runner-up Ryan Palmer.

Field
1. Playing members of the 2009 United States and International Presidents Cup teams.

Ángel Cabrera (3,4), Stewart Cink (2,3,4), Tim Clark (3,4,5), Ernie Els (3,4,5), Jim Furyk (2,3,4,5), Lucas Glover (3,4), Retief Goosen (3,4), Ryo Ishikawa, Zach Johnson (3,4,5), Anthony Kim (2,3,4,5), Justin Leonard (2), Hunter Mahan (2,3,4,5), Phil Mickelson (2,3,4,5), Geoff Ogilvy (3,4,5), Sean O'Hair (3,4), Kenny Perry (2,3,4), Adam Scott (3,4,5), Vijay Singh, Steve Stricker (2,3,4,5), Camilo Villegas (3,4,5), Mike Weir, Tiger Woods (3,4,5), Yang Yong-eun (3,4,5)

(Robert Allenby (3,4,5,6) withdrew prior to the start of the tournament with a knee injury.)

2. Playing members of the 2008 United States and European Ryder Cup teams.

Chad Campbell, Paul Casey (3,4), Ben Curtis, Sergio García (3,4), Søren Hansen, Pádraig Harrington (3,4), J. B. Holmes, Miguel Ángel Jiménez (3,4,5), Robert Karlsson (3,4,5), Graeme McDowell (3,4,5), Ian Poulter (3,4,5), Justin Rose (3,4,5), Henrik Stenson (3,4), Boo Weekley, Lee Westwood (3,4,5), Oliver Wilson

3. The top 50 players from the Official World Golf Ranking as of July 26, 2010.

K. J. Choi (4,6), Ben Crane (4,5), Rhys Davies (4), Luke Donald (4,5), Ross Fisher (4,5), Rickie Fowler (4), Peter Hanson, Dustin Johnson (4,5), Martin Kaymer (4,5), Matt Kuchar (4,5), Rory McIlroy (4,5), Edoardo Molinari (4,5), Francesco Molinari (4), Ryan Moore (4,5), Louis Oosthuizen (4,5), Álvaro Quirós (4), Charl Schwartzel (4), Bo Van Pelt (4), Scott Verplank (4), Nick Watney (4)

4. The top 50 players from the Official World Golf Ranking as of August 2, 2010.

Jeff Overton

5. Tournament winners of worldwide events since the prior year's tournament with an Official World Golf Ranking Strength of Field Rating of 115 points or more.

Stuart Appleby, Jason Bohn, Grégory Bourdy, Jason Day, Simon Dyson, Marcus Fraser, Bill Haas, David Horsey, Michael Jonzon, Simon Khan, James Kingston, Martin Laird, Troy Matteson, Ross McGowan, Alex Norén, Ryan Palmer, Heath Slocum, Bubba Watson

(Carl Pettersson qualified but did not play.)

6. The winner of selected tournaments from each of the following tours:
Japan Golf Tour: Japan Golf Tour Championship (2010) – Katsumasa Miyamoto
Japan Golf Tour: Bridgestone Open (2009) – Yuta Ikeda
PGA Tour of Australasia: Australian PGA Championship (2009) – Robert Allenby, also qualified in categories 1, 3, 4 and 5
Sunshine Tour: Vodacom Championship (2010) – Hennie Otto
Asian Tour: Iskandar Johor Open (2009) – K. J. Choi, also qualified in categories 3 and 4

Source

Past champions in the field 

Source:

Round summaries

First round
Thursday, August 5, 2010

Source:

Second round
Friday, August 6, 2010

Source:

Third round
Saturday, August 7, 2010

Source:

Final round
Sunday, August 8, 2010

Source:

Scorecard
Final round

Cumulative tournament scores, relative to par

Source:

References

External links
Coverage from the European Tour's official site
About event

WGC Invitational
WGC-Bridgestone Invitational
WGC-Bridgestone Invitational
WGC-Bridgestone Invitational